The R.H. Cowan Livery Stable, at 220 Maxwell Ave. in Springer, New Mexico, was built in 1883.  It was listed on the National Register of Historic Places in 1979.

In 1979 the building was "shaded on the north by an enormous cottonwood". On its gable front there is a round window with the words "R. H. Cowan Livery Stable" above, and, in 1979 it also showed "1883", although the date of construction was not fully readable. Historic photos show it fully.

References

Stables in the United States
National Register of Historic Places in Colfax County, New Mexico
Buildings and structures completed in 1883